Danio Merli (born June 9, 1956) is an Italian sprint canoer who competed from the mid-1970s to the early 1980s. He won a silver medal in the K-2 10000 m event at the 1975 ICF Canoe Sprint World Championships in Belgrade.

Merli also competed in two Summer Olympics, earning his best finish of ninth in the K-2 1000 m event at Moscow in 1980.
Now he is a gym teacher and one of three coaches of the Canoe Team of Canottieri Baldesio in Cremona, Lombardy.

References

Sports-reference.com profile

1956 births
Canoeists at the 1976 Summer Olympics
Canoeists at the 1980 Summer Olympics
Italian male canoeists
Living people
Olympic canoeists of Italy
ICF Canoe Sprint World Championships medalists in kayak
20th-century Italian people